The following is a list of genetic disorders and if known, type of mutation and for the chromosome involved. Although the parlance "disease-causing gene" is common, it is the occurrence of an abnormality in the parents that causes the impairment to develop within the child. There are over 6,000 known genetic disorders in humans.

Most common

 P – Point mutation, or any insertion/deletion entirely inside one gene
 D – Deletion of a gene or genes
 Dup - Duplication of a gene or genes
 C – Whole chromosome extra, missing, or both (see chromosome abnormality)
 T – Trinucleotide repeat disorders: gene is extended in length

Full genetic disorders list

References

Further reading 
 
 
 

Disorder
Genetic disorders
Genetic disorders
Genetic disorders